The Wedgwood Institute is a large red-brick building that stands in Queen Street, in the town of Burslem, Stoke-on-Trent, Staffordshire, England.  It is sometimes called the Wedgwood Memorial Institute, but it is not to be confused with the former Wedgwood Memorial College in Barlaston. It achieved listed building status (Grade II*) in 1972.

Construction and opening
The Wedgwood Institute was funded entirely by public subscription from 1859 onward, the estimated cost at the time being £4,000, and was constructed between 1863 and 1869. It was named after the potter Josiah Wedgwood, and it stands on the site of the former Brick House pottery works which Wedgwood had rented from 1762 to 1770. Brick House was the second of his pottery works in the town of Burslem, the first being at the Ivy House works. A small part of the old works was incorporated into the fabric of the new Institute.

The foundation stone of the new institute was laid by then Chancellor of the Exchequer William Ewart Gladstone on 26 October 1863; the building itself opened 21 April 1869.

The School of Art and Science opened in October 1869; the Free Library opened in 1870; their cost being by the levy of a penny rate (i.e.: a local universal property tax) under the Public Libraries Act.

Decorative scheme
The style of architecture chosen was Venetian Gothic, which had been popularised by John Ruskin.
The basic design is by an architect called Nichols, but the elaborate decorations which form an integral part of the facade were designed by Robert Edgar and John Lockwood Kipling. Kipling, the father of the famous writer Rudyard Kipling, emigrated to India in 1865 while the building was still under construction, and the façade was not completed until 1871.

It is an ornate building coated with numerous inlaid sculptures, ceramics and a series of zodiac mosaics, the latter executed by Signor Salviati. Over the entrance is a tympanum with portrait medallions of three people connected with Wedgwood's projects: these are John Flaxman, the sculptor, Joseph Priestley, the scientist and discoverer of oxygen, and Thomas Bentley (1730–1780), a business partner of Wedgwood. Above the tympanum is a statue of Josiah Wedgwood. The statue is in the middle of a frieze.

Around the upper storey is set a series of twelve terracotta panels to illustrate the months of the year, and above them mosaics of the corresponding signs of the zodiac. Around the middle of the building are ten terracotta panels depicting processes involved in the manufacture of pottery. The cresting at the top of the facade recalls the Doge's Palace.

Later history of the institute
The art students remained in the institute until 1905 when Burslem School of Art was provided with its own building directly opposite the institute. The local public lending library in the institute moved across the road to the Burslem School of Art in 2008 and then was closed by the council about 18 months later.

The institute was at one time as an annexe for Staffordshire University and more latterly for Stoke-on-Trent College. In 2009 it was used for an exhibition and lectures.

Conservation and new uses for the institute
The building is on the Heritage at Risk Register due to its poor condition although there are plans to address the problems and bring it back into use. The Prince's Regeneration Trust and the Burslem Regeneration Company have been working together to develop a viable new scheme for the institute. In 2012 The Prince's Regeneration Trust set up a project team with English Heritage, the Prince's Charities and Stoke-on-Trent Council. Working together, the team produced a design which will conserve the original 1860s building and revive the institute's raison d’être of supporting enterprise and delivering education.
 
Phase One Works

The Prince's Regeneration Trust carried out the first stage of the institute's restoration between February and September 2015. The building work was done by contractors William Anelay Ltd. Costing approximately £850,000, this has safeguarded the structure of the building and made the institute's ground floor available for temporary public use, such as office space, community events and exhibitions. The first phase was made possible with funding from the European Regional Development Fund, the Heritage Lottery Fund, Historic England and Stoke Council.

Main Phase Works

The main works aim to transform the building into an enterprise hub and centre for start-up businesses. The Prince's Regeneration Trust estimates that the institute could provide space for around 20 to 25 businesses, creating up to 150 jobs for local people, as well as room for business meetings, professional training and mentoring and community facilities.
Subject to further funding being secured, work on the main phase of the project is expected to start in spring 2017, with the fully redeveloped Institute due to open in 2018–19.

People associated with the institute
The building has played its part in the lives of many famous local people such as the scientist Oliver Lodge, the writer Arnold Bennett and potters such as Frederick Hurten Rhead and William Moorcroft.

References

External links 

Josiah Wedgwood Memorial Institute (sculpture) for detailed pictures of the building
Wedgwood Institute – Queen Street (Burslem)

Pictures of the building
Panoramic view of entire frieze
The building facade
Image of the friezes and statues at the front
Angle view of the building facade
Showing tableaux of the months
Tableaux of the months
Scroll-down images of the terracotta panels

Architecture in the United Kingdom
Buildings and structures in Stoke-on-Trent
Gothic Revival architecture in Staffordshire
Venetian Gothic architecture in the United Kingdom
Grade II* listed buildings in Staffordshire
Former library buildings in England
Public libraries in Staffordshire
Terracotta
Grade II* listed library buildings
Library buildings completed in 1869
1869 establishments in England
Structures on the Heritage at Risk register in Staffordshire